Hanyu Pinyin, often shortened to just pinyin, is the official romanization system for Standard Mandarin Chinese in China, and to some extent, in Singapore and Malaysia. It is often used to teach Mandarin, normally written in Chinese form, to learners already familiar with the Latin alphabet. The system includes four diacritics denoting tones, but pinyin without tone marks is used to spell Chinese names and words in languages written in the Latin script, and is also used in certain computer input methods to enter Chinese characters. The word  literally means "Han language" (i.e. Chinese language), while  means "spelled sounds".

The pinyin system was developed in the 1950s by a group of Chinese linguists including Zhou Youguang and was based on earlier forms of romanizations of Chinese. It was published by the Chinese Government in 1958 and revised several times. The International Organization for Standardization (ISO) adopted pinyin as an international standard, ISO 7098, in 1982 and was followed by the United Nations in 1986. Attempts to make pinyin standard in the ROC (Taiwan) occurred in 2002 and 2009, but "today Taiwan has no standardized spelling system" so that in 2019 "alphabetic spellings in Taiwan are marked more by a lack of system than the presence of one". Moreover, "some cities, businesses, and organizations, notably in the south of Taiwan, did not accept [efforts to introduce pinyin], as it suggested that Taiwan is more closely tied to the PRC", so it remains one of several rival romanization systems in use.

When a foreign writing system with one set of coding and decoding systems is taken to write a language, certain compromises may have to be made. The result is that the decoding systems used in some foreign languages will enable non-native speakers to produce sounds more closely resembling the target language than will the coding and decoding systems used by other foreign languages. Native speakers of English will decode pinyin spellings to fairly close approximations of Mandarin except in the case of certain speech sounds that are not ordinarily produced by most native speakers of English: j /tɕ/, q /tɕʰ/, x /ɕ/, z /ts/, c /tsʰ/, zh /ʈʂ/, ch /ʈʂʰ/, h /x/ and r /ɻ/ exhibit the greatest discrepancies.

In this system, the correspondence between the Latin letters and the sound is sometimes idiosyncratic, though not necessarily more so than the way the Latin script is employed in other languages. For example, the aspiration distinction between b, d, g and p, t, k is similar to that of these syllable-initial consonants in English (in which the two sets are, however, also differentiated by voicing), but not to that of French. From s, z, c come the digraphs sh, zh, ch by analogy with English sh, ch. Although this analogical use of digraphs introduces the novel combination zh, it is internally consistent in how the two series are related. Pinyin vowels are pronounced in a similar way to vowels in Romance languages.

The pronunciations and spellings of Chinese words are generally given in terms of initials and finals, which represent the language’s segmental phonemic portion, rather than letter by letter. Initials are initial consonants, whereas finals are all possible combinations of medials (semivowels coming before the vowel), a nucleus vowel, and coda (final vowel or consonant).

History

Background: romanization of Chinese before 1949 
In 1605, the Jesuit missionary Matteo Ricci published Xizi Qiji in Beijing. This was the first book to use the Roman alphabet to write the Chinese language. Twenty years later, another Jesuit in China, Nicolas Trigault, issued his  at Hangzhou. Neither book had much immediate impact on the way in which Chinese thought about their writing system, and the romanizations they described were intended more for Westerners than for the Chinese.

One of the earliest Chinese thinkers to relate Western alphabets to Chinese was late Ming to early Qing dynasty scholar-official, Fang Yizhi (1611–1671).

The first late Qing reformer to propose that China adopt a system of spelling was Song Shu (1862–1910). A student of the great scholars Yu Yue and Zhang Taiyan, Song had been to Japan and observed the stunning effect of the kana syllabaries and Western learning there. This galvanized him into activity on a number of fronts, one of the most important being reform of the script.  While Song did not himself actually create a system for spelling Sinitic languages, his discussion proved fertile and led to a proliferation of schemes for phonetic scripts.

Wade–Giles

The Wade–Giles system was produced by Thomas Wade in 1859, and further improved by Herbert Giles in the Chinese–English Dictionary of 1892. It was popular and used in English-language publications outside China until 1979.

Sin Wenz

In the early 1930s, Chinese Communist Party leaders trained in Moscow introduced a phonetic alphabet using Roman letters which had been developed in the Soviet Oriental Institute of Leningrad and was originally intended to improve literacy in the Russian Far East. This Sin Wenz or "New Writing" was much more linguistically sophisticated than earlier alphabets, but with the major exception that it did not indicate tones of Chinese.

In 1940, several thousand members attended a Border Region Sin Wenz Society convention. Mao Zedong and Zhu De, head of the army, both contributed their calligraphy (in characters) for the masthead of the Sin Wenz Society's new journal.  Outside the CCP, other prominent supporters included Sun Yat-sen's son, Sun Fo; Cai Yuanpei, the country's most prestigious educator; Tao Xingzhi, a leading educational reformer; and Lu Xun. Over thirty journals soon appeared written in Sin Wenz, plus large numbers of translations, biographies (including Lincoln, Franklin, Edison, Ford, and Charlie Chaplin), some contemporary Chinese literature, and a spectrum of textbooks. In 1940, the movement reached an apex when Mao's Border Region Government declared that the Sin Wenz had the same legal status as traditional characters in government and public documents.  Many educators and political leaders looked forward to the day when they would be universally accepted and completely replace Chinese characters.  Opposition arose, however, because the system was less well adapted to writing regional languages, and therefore would require learning Mandarin.  Sin Wenz fell into relative disuse during the following years.

Yale romanization

In 1943, the U.S. military engaged Yale University to develop a romanization of Mandarin Chinese for its pilots flying over China. Medial semivowels are written with y and w (instead of pinyin i and u), and apical vowels (syllabic consonants) with r or z. Accent marks are used to indicate tone.

Emergence and history of Hanyu Pinyin
Pinyin was created by a group of Chinese linguists, including Zhou Youguang who was an economist, as part of a Chinese government project in the 1950s. Zhou, often called "the father of pinyin," worked as a banker in New York when he decided to return to China to help rebuild the country after the establishment of the People's Republic of China. Mao Zedong initially considered Latinizing written Chinese, but during his first official visit to the Soviet Union in 1949 Joseph Stalin convinced him to maintain the existing writing system. Zhou became an economics professor in Shanghai, and in 1955, when China's Ministry of Education created a Committee for the Reform of the Chinese Written Language, Premier Zhou Enlai assigned Zhou Youguang the task of developing a new romanization system, despite the fact that he was not a professional linguist.

Hanyu Pinyin was based on several existing systems, including: Gwoyeu Romatzyh of 1928, Latinxua Sin Wenz of 1931, and the diacritic markings from zhuyin (bopomofo).  "I'm not the father of pinyin," Zhou said years later; "I'm the son of pinyin. It's [the result of] a long tradition from the later years of the Qing dynasty down to today. But we restudied the problem and revisited it and made it more perfect."

A draft was published on February 12, 1956.  The first edition of Hanyu Pinyin was approved and adopted at the Fifth Session of the 1st National People's Congress on February 11, 1958. It was then introduced to primary schools as a way to teach Standard Chinese pronunciation and used to improve the literacy rate among adults.

During the height of the Cold War, the use of pinyin system over the Yale romanization outside of China was regarded as a political statement or identification with the communist Chinese regime. Beginning in the early 1980s, Western publications addressing Mainland China began using the Hanyu Pinyin romanization system instead of earlier romanization systems; this change followed the normalization of diplomatic relations between the United States and the PRC in 1979. In 2001, the PRC Government issued the National Common Language Law, providing a legal basis for applying pinyin. The current specification of the orthographic rules is laid down in the National Standard GB/T 16159–2012.

Initials and finals
Unlike European languages, clusters of letters —initials and finals— and not consonant and vowel letters, form the fundamental elements in pinyin (and most other phonetic systems used to describe the Han language). Every Mandarin syllable can be spelled with exactly one initial followed by one final, except for the special syllable er or when a trailing -r is considered part of a syllable (see below, and see erhua). The latter case, though a common practice in some sub-dialects, is rarely used in official publications.

Even though most initials contain a consonant, finals are not always simple vowels, especially in compound finals, i.e. when a "medial" is placed in front of the final. Often these medials are treated as separate from the finals rather than as part of them; this convention is followed in the chart of finals below.

Initials
In each cell below, the bold letters indicate pinyin and the brackets enclose the symbol in the International Phonetic Alphabet.

1 y is pronounced  (a labial-palatal approximant) before u.2 The letters w and y are not included in the table of initials in the official pinyin system. They are an orthographic convention for the medials i, u and ü when no initial is present. When i, u, or ü are finals and no initial is present, they are spelled yi, wu, and yu, respectively.

The conventional lexicographical order (excluding w and y), derived from the zhuyin system ("bopomofo"), is:
{|cellspacing="0" cellpadding="3"
|style="background: #ccf;"|b  p  m  f 
|style="background: #cfc;"| d  t  n  l 
|style="background: #fcc;"| g  k h 
|style="background: #fcf;"| j  q  x 
|style="background: #cff;"| zh  ch  sh  r 
|style="background: #ffc;"| z  c  s
|}

According to Scheme for the Chinese Phonetic Alphabet, zh, ch, and sh can be abbreviated as ẑ, ĉ, and ŝ (z, c, s with a circumflex). However, the shorthands are rarely used due to difficulty of entering them on computers and are confined mainly to Esperanto keyboard layouts.

Finals

In each cell below, the first line indicates IPA, the second indicates pinyin for a standalone (no-initial) form, and the third indicates pinyin for a combination with an initial. Other than finals modified by an -r, which are omitted, the following is an exhaustive table of all possible finals.1

The only syllable-final consonants in Standard Chinese are -n and -ng, and -r, the last of which is attached as a grammatical suffix.  A Chinese syllable ending with any other consonant either is from a non-Mandarin language (a southern Chinese language such as Cantonese, or a minority language of China; possibly reflecting final consonants in Old Chinese), or indicates the use of a non-pinyin romanization system (where final consonants may be used to indicate tones). 

1 For other finals formed by the suffix -r, pinyin does not use special orthography; one simply appends r to the final that it is added to, without regard for any sound changes that may take place along the way. For information on sound changes related to final r, please see Erhua#Rules in Standard Mandarin.
2 ü is written as u after y, j, q, or x.
3 uo is written as o after b, p, m, f, or w.

Technically, i, u, ü without a following vowel are finals, not medials, and therefore take the tone marks, but they are more concisely displayed as above. In addition, ê  and syllabic nasals m, n, ng are used as interjections.

According to Scheme for the Chinese Phonetic Alphabet, ng can be abbreviated with a shorthand of ŋ. However, this shorthand is rarely used due to difficulty of entering them on computers.

The ü sound
An umlaut is placed over the letter u when it occurs after the initials l and n when necessary in order to represent the sound [y]. This is necessary in order to distinguish the front high rounded vowel in lü (e.g. ) from the back high rounded vowel in lu (e.g. ). Tonal markers are added on top of the umlaut, as in lǘ.

However, the ü is not used in the other contexts where it could represent a front high rounded vowel, namely after the letters j, q, x, and y. For example, the sound of the word / (fish) is transcribed in pinyin simply as yú, not as yǘ. This practice is opposed to Wade–Giles, which always uses ü, and Tongyong Pinyin, which always uses yu. Whereas Wade–Giles needs the umlaut to distinguish between chü (pinyin ju) and chu (pinyin zhu), this ambiguity does not arise with pinyin, so the more convenient form ju is used instead of jü. Genuine ambiguities only happen with nu/nü and lu/lü, which are then distinguished by an umlaut.

Many fonts or output methods do not support an umlaut for ü or cannot place tone marks on top of ü. Likewise, using ü in input methods is difficult because it is not present as a simple key on many keyboard layouts. For these reasons v is sometimes used instead by convention. For example, it is common for cellphones to use v instead of ü. Additionally, some stores in China use v instead of ü in the transliteration of their names. The drawback is that there are no tone marks for the letter v.

Previously, the practice varied among different passport issuing offices, with some transcribing as "LV" and "NV" while others used "LU" and "NU". On 10 July 2012, the Ministry of Public Security standardized the practice to use "LYU" and "NYU" in passports.

Although nüe written as nue, and lüe written as lue are not ambiguous, nue or lue are not correct according to the rules; nüe and lüe should be used instead. However, some Chinese input methods (e.g. Microsoft Pinyin IME) support both nve/lve (typing v for ü) and nue/lue.

Approximations to English pronunciation

Most rules given here in terms of English pronunciation are approximations, as several of these sounds do not correspond directly to sounds in English.

Pronunciation of initials

* Note on y and w
Y and w are equivalent to the semivowel medials i, u, and ü (see below). They are spelled differently when there is no initial consonant in order to mark a new syllable: fanguan is fan-guan, while fangwan is fang-wan (and equivalent to *fang-uan). With this convention, an apostrophe only needs to be used to mark an initial a, e, or o: Xi'an vs. xian. In addition, y and w are added to fully vocalic i, u, and ü when these occur without an initial consonant, so that they are written yi, wu, and yu. See below for a few finals which are abbreviated after a consonant plus w/u or y/i medial: wen → C+un, wei → C+ui, weng → C+ong, and you → Q+iu.

** Note on the apostrophe
The apostrophe (') is used before a syllable starting with a vowel (or ) in a multiple-syllable word, unless the syllable starts the word or immediately follows a hyphen or other dash. This apostrophe is not used in the Taipei Metro names.

Apostrophes (as well as hyphens and tone marks) are omitted on Chinese passports.

Pronunciation of finals

The following is a list of finals in Standard Chinese, excepting most of those ending with r.

To find a given final:
Remove the initial consonant. zh, ch, and sh count as initial consonants.
Change initial w to u and initial y to i. For weng, wen, wei, you, look under ong, un, ui, iu.
For u (including the ones starting with u) after j, q, x, or y, look under ü.

Tones

The pinyin system also uses diacritics to mark the four tones of Mandarin. The diacritic is placed over the letter that represents the syllable nucleus, unless that letter is missing (see below).

If the tone mark is written over an i, the tittle above the i is omitted, as in yī.

Many books printed in China use a mix of fonts, with vowels and tone marks rendered in a different font from the surrounding text, tending to give such pinyin texts a typographically ungainly appearance. This style, most likely rooted in early technical limitations, has led many to believe that pinyin's rules call for this practice, e.g. the use of a Latin alpha (ɑ) rather than the standard style (a) found in most fonts, or g often written with a single-storey ɡ. The rules of Hanyu Pinyin, however, specify no such practice.

 The first tone (flat or high-level tone) is represented by a macron (ˉ) added to the pinyin vowel:
ā ē ī ō ū ǖ Ā Ē Ī Ō Ū Ǖ
 The second tone (rising or high-rising tone) is denoted by an acute accent (ˊ):
á é í ó ú ǘ Á É Í Ó Ú Ǘ
 The third tone (falling-rising or low tone) is marked by a caron/háček (ˇ). It is not the rounded breve (˘), though a breve is sometimes substituted due to ignorance or font limitations.
ǎ ě ǐ ǒ ǔ ǚ Ǎ Ě Ǐ Ǒ Ǔ Ǚ
 The fourth tone (falling or high-falling tone) is represented by a grave accent (ˋ):
à è ì ò ù ǜ À È Ì Ò Ù Ǜ
 The fifth tone (neutral tone) is represented by a normal vowel without any accent mark:
a e i o u ü A E I O U Ü
In dictionaries, neutral tone may be indicated by a dot preceding the syllable; for example, ·ma. When a neutral tone syllable has an alternative pronunciation in another tone, a combination of tone marks may be used: zhī·dào.

Numerals in place of tone marks
Before the advent of computers, many typewriter fonts did not contain vowels with macron or caron diacritics. Tones were thus represented by placing a tone number at the end of individual syllables. For example, tóng is written tong².
The number used for each tone is as the order listed above, except the neutral tone, which is either not numbered, or given the number 0 or 5, e.g. ma⁵ for ／, an interrogative marker.

Rules for placing the tone mark
Briefly, the tone mark should always be placed by the order—a, o, e, i, u, ü, with the only exception being iu, where the tone mark is placed on the u instead. Pinyin tone marks appear primarily above the nucleus of the syllable, for example as in kuài, where k is the initial, u the medial, a the nucleus, and i the coda. The exception is syllabic nasals like /m/, where the nucleus of the syllable is a consonant, the diacritic will be carried by a written dummy vowel.

When the nucleus is /ə/ (written e or o), and there is both a medial and a coda, the nucleus may be dropped from writing. In this case, when the coda is a consonant n or ng, the only vowel left is the medial i, u, or ü, and so this takes the diacritic. However, when the coda is a vowel, it is the coda rather than the medial which takes the diacritic in the absence of a written nucleus. This occurs with syllables ending in -ui (from wei: wèi → -uì) and in -iu (from you: yòu → -iù). That is, in the absence of a written nucleus the finals have priority for receiving the tone marker, as long as they are vowels: if not, the medial takes the diacritic.

An algorithm to find the correct vowel letter (when there is more than one) is as follows:

 If there is an a or an e, it will take the tone mark
 If there is an ou, then the o takes the tone mark
 Otherwise, the second vowel takes the tone mark

Worded differently,
 If there is an a, e, or o, it will take the tone mark; in the case of ao, the mark goes on the a
 Otherwise, the vowels are -iu or -ui, in which case the second vowel takes the tone mark

The above can be summarized as the following table. The vowel letter taking the tone mark is indicated by the fourth-tone mark.
 {| class="wikitable" style="text-align:center"
|+ 
|-
! !!-a!!-e!!-i!!-o!!-u
|-
!a-
| || ||ài||ào|| 
|-
!e-
| || ||èi|| || 
|-
!i-
|ià, iào||iè|| ||iò||iù
|-
!o-
| || || || ||òu
|-
!u-
|uà, uài||uè||uì||uò|| 
|-
!ü-
|(üà)||üè|| || || 
|}

Phonological intuition

The placement of the tone marker, when more than one of the written letters a, e, i, o, and u appears, can also be inferred from the nature of the vowel sound in the medial and final. The rule is that the tone marker goes on the spelled vowel that is not a (near-)semi-vowel. The exception is that, for triphthongs that are spelled with only two vowel letters, both of which are the semi-vowels, the tone marker goes on the second spelled vowel.

Specifically, if the spelling of a diphthong begins with i (as in ia) or u (as in ua), which serves as a near-semi-vowel, this letter does not take the tone marker. Likewise, if the spelling of a diphthong ends with o or u representing a near-semi-vowel (as in ao or ou), this letter does not receive a tone marker. In a triphthong spelled with three of a, e, i, o, and u (with i or u replaced by y or w at the start of a syllable), the first and third letters coincide with near-semi-vowels and hence do not receive the tone marker (as in iao or uai or iou). But if no letter is written to represent a triphthong's middle (non-semi-vowel) sound (as in ui or iu), then the tone marker goes on the final (second) vowel letter.

Using tone colors
In addition to tone number and mark, tone color has been suggested as a visual aid for learning. Although there are no formal standards, there are a number of different color schemes in use, Dummitt's being one of the first.

Indication of tone change in pinyin spelling
Tone sandhi (tone change) is usually not reflected in pinyin spelling — the underlying tone (i.e. the original tone before the sandhi) is still written. However, ABC English–Chinese, Chinese–English Dictionary (2010) uses the following notation to indicate both the original tone and the tone after the sandhi:
  (yī) pronounced in second tone (yí) is written as yị̄.
 e.g.  (underlying yīgòng, realized as yígòng) is written as yị̄gòng
  (yī) pronounced in fourth tone (yì) is written as yī̠.
 e.g.  (underlying yīqǐ, realized as yìqǐ) is written as yī̠qǐ
  (bù) pronounced in second tone (bú) is written as bụ̀.
 e.g.  (underlying bùyào, realized as búyào) is written as bụ̀yào
 When there are two consecutive third-tone syllables, the first syllable is pronounced in second tone. A dot is added below to the third tone pronounced in second tone (i.e. written as ạ̌/Ạ̌, ẹ̌/Ẹ̌, ị̌, ọ̌/Ọ̌, ụ̌, and ụ̈̌).
 e.g.  (underlying liǎojiě, realized as liáojiě) is written as liạ̌ojiě

Wenlin Software for learning Chinese also adopted this notation.

Orthographic rules

Letters

The Scheme for the Chinese Phonetic Alphabet lists the letters of pinyin, along with their pronunciations, as:

Pinyin differs from other romanizations in several aspects, such as the following:

Syllables starting with u are written as w in place of u (e.g., *uan is written as wan). Standalone u is written as wu.
Syllables starting with i are written as y in place of i (e.g., *ian is written as yan). Standalone i is written as yi.
Syllables starting with ü are written as yu in place of ü (e.g., *üe is written as yue). Standalone ü is written as yu.
ü is written as u when there is no ambiguity (such as ju, qu, and xu) but as ü when there are corresponding u syllables (such as lü and nü). If there are corresponding u syllables, it is often replaced with v on a computer to make it easier to type on a standard keyboard.
After by a consonant, iou, uei, and uen are simplified as iu, ui, and un, which do not represent the actual pronunciation.
As in zhuyin, syllables that are actually pronounced as buo, puo, muo, and fuo are given a separate representation: bo, po, mo, and fo.
The apostrophe (') is used before a syllable starting with a vowel (a, o, or e) in a syllable other than the first of a word, the syllable being most commonly realized as  unless it immediately follows a hyphen or other dash. (The ambiguity does not occur when tone marks are used since both tone marks in "Xīān" unambiguously show that the word has two syllables. However, even with tone marks, the city is usually spelled with an apostrophe as "Xī'ān".)
Eh alone is written as ê; elsewhere as e. Schwa is always written as e.
Zh, ch, and sh can be abbreviated as ẑ, ĉ, and ŝ (z, c, s with a circumflex). However, the shorthands are rarely used because of the difficulty of entering them on computers and are confined mainly to Esperanto keyboard layouts. Early drafts and some published material used diacritic hooks below instead:  (/), .
Ng has the uncommon shorthand of ŋ, which was also used in early drafts.
 Early drafts also contained the symbol ɥ or the letter ч borrowed from the Cyrillic script, in place of later j for the voiceless alveolo-palatal sibilant affricate.
The letter v is unused, except in spelling foreign languages, languages of minority nationalities, and some dialects, despite a conscious effort to distribute letters more evenly than in Western languages. However, the ease of typing into a computer causes the v to be sometimes used to replace ü.

Most of the above are used to avoid ambiguity when words of more than one syllable are written in pinyin. For example, uenian is written as wenyan because it is not clear which syllables make up uenian; uen-ian, uen-i-an, u-en-i-an, u-e-nian, and u-e-ni-an are all possible combinations, but wenyan is unambiguous since we, nya, etc. do not exist in pinyin. See the pinyin table article for a summary of possible pinyin syllables (not including tones).

Words, capitalization, initialisms and punctuation

Although Chinese characters represent single syllables, Mandarin Chinese is a polysyllabic language. Spacing in pinyin is usually based on words, and not on single syllables. However, there are often ambiguities in partitioning a word. 

The Basic Rules of the Chinese Phonetic Alphabet Orthography were put into effect in 1988 by the National Educational Commission and the National Language Commission. These rules became a Guóbiāo recommendation in 1996 and were updated in 2012.

General
Single meaning: Words with a single meaning, which are usually set up of two characters (sometimes one, seldom three), are written together and not capitalized: rén (person); péngyou (friend); qiǎokèlì (chocolate)
Combined meaning (2 or 3 characters): Same goes for words combined of two words to one meaning: hǎifēng (sea breeze); wèndá (question and answer); quánguó (nationwide); chángyòngcí (common words)
Combined meaning (4 or more characters): Words with four or more characters having one meaning are split up with their original meaning if possible: wúfèng gāngguǎn (seamless steel-tube); huánjìng bǎohù guīhuà (environmental protection planning); gāoměngsuānjiǎ (potassium permanganate)
Duplicated words
AA: Duplicated characters (AA) are written together: rénrén (everybody), kànkan (to have a look), niánnián (every year)
ABAB: Two characters duplicated (ABAB) are written separated: yánjiū yánjiū (to study, to research), xuěbái xuěbái (white as snow)
AABB: Characters in the AABB schema are written together: láiláiwǎngwǎng (come and go), qiānqiānwànwàn (numerous)
Prefixes and Suffixes: Words accompanied by prefixes such as fù (vice), zǒng (chief), fēi (non-), fǎn (anti-), chāo (ultra-), lǎo (old), ā (used before names to indicate familiarity), kě (-able), wú (-less) and bàn (semi-) and suffixes such as zi (noun suffix), r (diminutive suffix), tou (noun suffix), xìng (-ness, -ity), zhě (-er, -ist), yuán (person), jiā (-er, -ist), shǒu (person skilled in a field), huà (-ize) and men (plural marker) are written together: fùbùzhǎng (vice minister), chéngwùyuán (conductor), háizimen (children)
Nouns and names
Words of position are separated: mén wài (outdoor), hé li (under the river), huǒchē shàngmian (on the train), Huáng Hé yǐnán (south of the Yellow River)
Exceptions are words traditionally connected: tiānshang (in the sky or outerspace), dìxia (on the ground), kōngzhōng (in the air), hǎiwài (overseas)
Surnames are separated from the given names, each capitalized: Lǐ Huá, Zhāng Sān. If the surname and/or given name consists of two syllables, it should be written as one: Zhūgě Kǒngmíng.
Titles following the name are separated and are not capitalized: Wáng bùzhǎng (Minister Wang), Lǐ xiānsheng (Mr. Li), Tián zhǔrèn (Director Tian), Zhào tóngzhì (Comrade Zhao).
The forms of addressing people with prefixes such as Lǎo, Xiǎo, Dà and Ā are capitalized: Xiǎo Liú ([young] Ms./Mr. Liu), Dà Lǐ ([great; elder] Mr. Li), Ā Sān (Ah San), Lǎo Qián ([senior] Mr. Qian), Lǎo Wú ([senior] Mr. Wu)
Exceptions include Kǒngzǐ (Confucius), Bāogōng (Judge Bao), Xīshī (Xishi), Mèngchángjūn (Lord Mengchang)
Geographical names of China: Běijīng Shì (city of Beijing), Héběi Shěng (province of Hebei), Yālù Jiāng (Yalu River), Tài Shān (Mount Tai), Dòngtíng Hú (Dongting Lake), Qióngzhōu Hǎixiá (Qiongzhou Strait)
Monosyllabic prefixes and suffixes are written together with their related part: Dōngsì Shítiáo (Dongsi 10th Alley)
Common geographical nouns that have become part of proper nouns are written together: Hēilóngjiāng (Heilongjiang)
Non-Chinese names are written in Hanyu Pinyin: Āpèi Āwàngjìnměi (Ngapoi Ngawang Jigme); Dōngjīng (Tokyo)
Verbs: Verbs and their suffixes -zhe, -le or -guo (() are written as one: kànzhe (seeing), jìnxíngguo (have been implemented). Le as it appears in the end of a sentence is separated though: Huǒchē dào le. (The train [has] arrived).
Verbs and their objects are separated: kàn xìn (read a letter), chī yú (eat fish), kāi wánxiào (to be kidding).
If verbs and their complements are each monosyllabic, they are written together; if not, they are separated: gǎohuài (to make broken), dǎsǐ (hit to death), huàwéi (to become), zhěnglǐ hǎo (to sort out), gǎixiě wéi (to rewrite as)
Adjectives: A monosyllabic adjective and its reduplication are written as one: mēngmēngliàng (dim), liàngtángtáng (shining bright)
Complements of size or degree such as xiē, yīxiē, diǎnr and yīdiǎnr are written separated: dà xiē, a little bigger), kuài yīdiǎnr (a bit faster)
Pronouns
Personal pronouns and interrogative pronouns are separated from other words: Wǒ ài Zhōngguó. (I love China); Shéi shuō de? (Who said it?)
The demonstrative pronoun zhè (this), nà (that) and the question pronoun nǎ (which) are separated: zhè rén (this person), nà cì huìyì (that meeting), nǎ zhāng bàozhǐ (which newspaper)
Exception—If zhè, nà or nǎ are followed by diǎnr, bān, biān, shí, huìr, lǐ, me or the general classifier ge, they are written together: nàlǐ (there), zhèbiān (over here), zhège (this)
Numerals and measure words
Numbers and words like gè (each), měi (each), mǒu (any), běn (this), gāi (that), wǒ (my, our) and nǐ (your) are separated from the measure words following them: liǎng gè rén (two people), gè guó (every nation), měi nián (every year), mǒu gōngchǎng (a certain factory), wǒ xiào (our school)
Numbers up to 100 are written as single words: sānshísān (thirty-three). Above that, the hundreds, thousands, etc. are written as separate words: jiǔyì qīwàn èrqiān sānbǎi wǔshíliù (nine hundred million, seventy-two thousand, three hundred fifty-six). Arabic numerals are kept as Arabic numerals: 635 fēnjī (extension 635)
According to  6.1.5.4, the dì used in ordinal numerals is followed by a hyphen: dì-yī (first), dì-356 (356th). The hyphen should not be used if the word in which dì and the numeral appear does not refer to an ordinal number in the context. For example: Dìwǔ (a Chinese compound surname). The chū in front of numbers one to ten is written together with the number: chūshí (tenth day)
Numbers representing month and day are hyphenated: wǔ-sì (May fourth), yīèr-jiǔ (December ninth)
Words of approximations such as duō, lái and jǐ are separated from numerals and measure words: yībǎi duō gè (around a hundred); shí lái wàn gè (around a hundred thousand); jǐ jiā rén (a few families)
Shíjǐ (more than ten) and jǐshí (tens) are written together: shíjǐ gè rén (more than ten people); jǐshí (tens of steel pipes)
Approximations with numbers or units that are close together are hyphenated: sān-wǔ tiān (three to five days), qiān-bǎi cì (thousands of times)
Other function words are separated from other words
Adverbs: hěn hǎo (very good), zuì kuài (fastest), fēicháng dà (extremely big)
Prepositions: zài qiánmiàn (in front)
Conjunctions: nǐ hé wǒ (you and I/me), Nǐ lái háishi bù lái? (Are you coming or not?)
"Constructive auxiliaries" such as de, zhī and suǒ: mànmàn de zou, go slowly)
A monosyllabic word can also be written together with de: wǒ de shū / wǒde shū (my book)
Modal auxiliaries at the end of a sentence: Nǐ zhīdào ma? (Do you know?), Kuài qù ba! (Go quickly!)
Exclamations and interjections: À! Zhēn měi!, Oh, it's so beautiful!)
Onomatopoeia: mó dāo huòhuò (honing a knife), hōnglōng yī shēng (rumbling)
Capitalization
The first letter of the first word in a sentence is capitalized: Chūntiān lái le. (Spring has arrived.)
The first letter of each line in a poem is capitalized.
The first letter of a proper noun is capitalized: Běijīng (Beijing), Guójì Shūdiàn (International Bookstore), Guójiā Yǔyán Wénzì Gōngzuò Wěiyuánhuì (National Language Commission)
On some occasions, proper nouns can be written in all caps: BĚIJĪNG, GUÓJÌ SHŪDIÀN, GUÓJIĀ YǓYÁN WÉNZÌ GŌNGZUÒ WĚIYUÁNHUÌ
If a proper noun is written together with a common noun to make a proper noun, it is capitalized. If not, it is not capitalized: Fójiào (Buddhism), Tángcháo (Tang dynasty), jīngjù (Beijing opera), chuānxiōng (Szechuan lovage)
Title case is used for the names of books, newspapers, magazines and other artistic works.  As in English, certain function words (e.g. de, hé, zài) are not capitalized: Kuángrén Rìjì (Diary of a Madman), Tàiyáng Zhào zài Sānggàn Hé shàng, Zhōngguó Qīngnián Bào ( China Youth Daily).
Initialisms
Single words are abbreviated by taking the first letter of each character of the word: Beǐjīng (Beijing) → BJ
A group of words are abbreviated by taking the first letter of each word in the group: guójiā biāozhǔn (Guóbiāo standard) → GB
Initials can also be indicated using full stops: Beǐjīng → B.J., guójiā biāozhǔn → G.B.
When abbreviating names, the surname is written fully (first letter capitalized or in all caps), but only the first letter of each character in the given name is taken, with full stops after each initial: Lǐ Huá → Lǐ H. or LǏ H., Zhūgě Kǒngmíng → Zhūgě K. M. or ZHŪGĚ K. M.
Line wrapping
Words can only be split by the character:guāngmíng (bright) → guāng-míng, not gu-āngmíng
Initials cannot be split:Wáng J. G. → WángJ. G., not Wáng J.-G.
Apostrophes are removed in line wrapping:Xī'ān (Xi'an) → Xī-ān, not Xī-'ān
When the original word has a hyphen, the hyphen is added at the beginning of the new line:chēshuǐ-mǎlóng (heavy traffic: "carriage, water, horse, dragon") → chēshuǐ--mǎlóng
Hyphenation: In addition to the situations mentioned above, there are four situations where hyphens are used.
Coordinate and disjunctive compound words, where the two elements are conjoined or opposed, but retain their individual meaning: gōng-jiàn (bow and arrow), kuài-màn (speed: "fast-slow"), shíqī-bā suì (17–18 years old), dǎ-mà (beat and scold), Yīng-Hàn (English–Chinese [dictionary]), Jīng-Jīn (Beijing–Tianjin), lù-hǎi-kōngjūn (army-navy-airforce).
Abbreviated compounds: gōnggòng guānxì (public relations) → gōng-guān (PR), chángtú diànhuà (long-distance calling) → cháng-huà (LDC). Exceptions are made when the abbreviated term has become established as a word in its own right, as in chūzhōng for chūjí zhōngxué (junior high school). Abbreviations of proper-name compounds, however, should always be hyphenated: Běijīng Dàxué (Peking University) → Běi-Dà (PKU).
Four-syllable idioms: fēngpíng-làngjìng, calm and tranquil: "wind calm, waves down"), huījīn-rútǔ (spend money like water: "throw gold like dirt"), zhǐ-bǐ-mò-yàn (paper-brush-ink-inkstone [four coordinate words]).
Other idioms are separated according to the words that make up the idiom: bēi hēiguō (to be made a scapegoat: "to carry a black pot"), zhǐ xǔ zhōuguān fànghuǒ, bù xǔ bǎixìng diǎndēng (Gods may do what cattle may not: "only the official is allowed to light the fire; the commoners are not allowed to light a lamp")
Punctuation
The Chinese full stop (。) is changed to a western full stop (.)
The hyphen is a half-width hyphen (-)
Ellipsis can be changed from 6 dots (......) to 3 dots (...)
The enumeration comma (、) is changed to a normal comma
All other punctuation marks are the same as the ones used in normal texts

Comparison with other orthographies
Pinyin is now used by foreign students learning Chinese as a second language, as well as Bopomofo.

Pinyin assigns some Latin letters sound values which are quite different from those of most languages. This has drawn some criticism as it may lead to confusion when uninformed speakers apply either native or English assumed pronunciations to words. However, this problem is not limited only to pinyin, since many languages that use the Latin alphabet natively also assign different values to the same letters. A recent study on Chinese writing and literacy concluded, "By and large, pinyin represents the Chinese sounds better than the Wade–Giles system, and does so with fewer extra marks."

As Pinyin is a phonetic writing system for modern Standard Chinese, it is not designed to replace Chinese characters for writing Literary Chinese, the standard written language prior to the early 1900s. In particular, Chinese characters retains semantic cues that helps distinguish differently pronounced words in the ancient classical language that are now homophones in Mandarin. Thus, Chinese characters remain indispensable for recording and transmitting the corpus of Chinese writing from the past.

Pinyin is also not designed to transcribe Chinese language varieties other than Standard Chinese, which is based on the phonological system of Beijing Mandarin. Other romanization schemes have been devised to transcribe those other Chinese varieties, such as Jyutping for Cantonese and Pe̍h-ōe-jī for Hokkien.

Comparison charts

Unicode code points
Based on ISO 7098:2015, Information and Documentation: Chinese Romanization, tonal marks for pinyin should use the symbols from Combining Diacritical Marks, as opposed by the use of Spacing Modifier Letters in Bopomofo. Lowercase letters with tone marks are included in GB/T 2312 and their uppercase counterparts are included in JIS X 0212; thus Unicode includes all the common accented characters from pinyin.

Due to The Basic Rules of the Chinese Phonetic Alphabet Orthography, all accented letters are required to have both uppercase and lowercase characters as per their normal counterparts.

GBK has mapped two characters ‘ḿ’ and ‘ǹ’ to Private Use Areas in Unicode as U+E7C7 and U+E7C8 respectively, thus some Simplified Chinese fonts (e.g. SimSun) that adheres to GBK include both characters in the Private Use Areas, and some input methods (e.g. Sogou Pinyin) also outputs the Private Use Areas code point instead of the original character. As the superset GB 18030 changed the mappings of ‘ḿ’ and ‘ǹ’, this has an caused issue where the input methods and font files use different encoding standard, and thus the input and output of both characters are mixed up.

Other symbols that are used in pinyin is as follow:

Other punctuation mark and symbols in Chinese are to use the equivalent symbol in English noted in to GB/T 15834.

In educational usage, to match the handwritten style, some fonts used a different style for the letter a and g to have an appearance of single-storey a and single-storey g. Fonts that follow GB/T 2312 usually make single-storey a in the accented pinyin characters but leaving unaccented double-storey a, causing a discrepancy in the font itself. Unicode did not provide an official way to encode single-storey a and single-storey g, but as IPA require the differentiation of single-storey and double-storey a and g, thus the single-storey character ɑ/ɡ in IPA should be used if the need to separate single-storey a and g arises. For daily usage there is no need to differentiate single-storey and double-storey a/g.

Usage

Pinyin superseded older romanization systems such as Wade–Giles (1859; modified 1892) and postal romanization, and replaced zhuyin as the method of Chinese phonetic instruction in mainland China. The ISO adopted pinyin as the standard romanization for modern Chinese in 1982 (ISO 7098:1982, superseded by ISO 7098:2015).  The United Nations followed suit in 1986.  It has also been accepted by the government of Singapore, the United States's Library of Congress, the American Library Association, and many other international institutions.

The spelling of Chinese geographical or personal names in pinyin has become the most common way to transcribe them in English.  Pinyin has also become the dominant method for entering Chinese text into computers in Mainland China, in contrast to Taiwan; where Bopomofo is most commonly used.

Families outside of Taiwan who speak Mandarin as a mother tongue use pinyin to help children associate characters with spoken words which they already know.  Chinese families outside of Taiwan who speak some other language as their mother tongue use the system to teach children Mandarin pronunciation when they learn vocabulary in elementary school.

Since 1958, pinyin has been actively used in adult education as well, making it easier for formerly illiterate people to continue with self-study after a short period of pinyin literacy instruction.

Pinyin has become a tool for many foreigners to learn Mandarin pronunciation, and is used to explain both the grammar and spoken Mandarin coupled with Chinese characters.  Books containing both Chinese characters and pinyin are often used by foreign learners of Chinese.  Pinyin's role in teaching pronunciation to foreigners and children is similar in some respects to furigana-based books (with hiragana letters written above or next to kanji, directly analogous to zhuyin) in Japanese or fully vocalised texts in Arabic ("vocalised Arabic").

The tone-marking diacritics are commonly omitted in popular news stories and even in scholarly works, as well as in the traditional Mainland Chinese Braille system, which is similar to pinyin, but meant for blind readers. This results in some degree of ambiguity as to which words are being represented.

Computer input systems
Simple computer systems, able to display only 7-bit ASCII text (essentially the 26 Latin letters, 10 digits, and punctuation marks), long provided a convincing argument for using unaccented pinyin instead of Chinese characters. Today, however, most computer systems are able to display characters from Chinese and many other writing systems as well, and have them entered with a Latin keyboard using an input method editor. Alternatively, some PDAs, tablet computers, and digitizing tablets allow users to input characters graphically by writing with a stylus, with concurrent online handwriting recognition.

Pinyin with accents can be entered with the use of special keyboard layouts or various character map utilities. X keyboard extension includes a "Hanyu Pinyin (altgr)" layout for AltGr-triggered dead key input of accented characters.

In Taiwan

Taiwan (Republic of China) adopted Tongyong Pinyin, a modification of Hanyu Pinyin, as the official romanization system on the national level between October 2002 and January 2009, when it decided to promote Hanyu Pinyin. Tongyong Pinyin ("common phonetic"), a romanization system developed in Taiwan, was designed to romanize languages and dialects spoken on the island in addition to Mandarin Chinese. The Kuomintang (KMT) party resisted its adoption, preferring the Hanyu Pinyin system used in mainland China and in general use internationally. Romanization preferences quickly became associated with issues of national identity. Preferences split along party lines: the KMT and its affiliated parties in the pan-blue coalition supported the use of Hanyu Pinyin while the Democratic Progressive Party and its affiliated parties in the pan-green coalition favored the use of Tongyong Pinyin.

Tongyong Pinyin was made the official system in an administrative order that allowed its adoption by local governments to be voluntary. Locales in Kaohsiung, Tainan and other areas use romanizations derived from Tongyong Pinyin for some district and street names. A few localities with governments controlled by the KMT, most notably Taipei, Hsinchu, and Kinmen County, overrode the order and converted to Hanyu Pinyin before the January 1, 2009 national-level decision, though with a slightly different capitalization convention than mainland China. Most areas of Taiwan adopted Tongyong Pinyin, consistent with the national policy. Today, many street signs in Taiwan are using Tongyong Pinyin-derived romanizations, but some, especially in northern Taiwan, display Hanyu Pinyin-derived romanizations. It is not unusual to see spellings on street signs and buildings derived from the older Wade–Giles, MPS2 and other systems.

Attempts to make pinyin standard in Taiwan have had uneven success, with most place and proper names remaining unaffected, including all major cities. Personal names on Taiwanese passports honor the choices of Taiwanese citizens, who can choose Wade-Giles, Hakka, Hoklo, Tongyong, aboriginal, or pinyin. Official pinyin use is controversial, as when pinyin use for a metro line in 2017 provoked protests, despite government responses that "The romanization used on road signs and at transportation stations is intended for foreigners... Every foreigner learning Mandarin learns Hanyu pinyin, because it is the international standard...The decision has nothing to do with the nation’s self-determination or any ideologies, because the key point is to ensure that foreigners can read signs."

In Singapore

Singapore implemented Hanyu Pinyin as the official romanization system for Mandarin in the public sector starting in the 1980s, in conjunction with the Speak Mandarin Campaign. Hanyu Pinyin is also used as the romanization system to teach Mandarin Chinese at schools. While the process of Pinyinisation has been mostly successful in government communication, placenames, and businesses established in the 1980s and onward, it continues to be unpopular in some areas, most notably for personal names and vocabulary borrowed from other varieties of Chinese already established in the local vernacular. In these situations, romanization continues to be based on the Chinese language variety it originated from, especially the three largest Chinese varieties traditionally spoken in Singapore (Hokkien, Teochew, and Cantonese).

For other languages

Pinyin-like systems have been devised for other variants of Chinese. Guangdong Romanization is a set of romanizations devised by the government of Guangdong province for Cantonese, Teochew, Hakka (Moiyen dialect), and Hainanese. All of these are designed to use Latin letters in a similar way to pinyin.

In addition, in accordance to the Regulation of Phonetic Transcription in Hanyu Pinyin Letters of Place Names in Minority Nationality Languages promulgated in 1976, place names in non-Han languages like Mongolian, Uyghur, and Tibetan are also officially transcribed using pinyin in a system adopted by the State Administration of Surveying and Mapping and Geographical Names Committee known as SASM/GNC romanization. The pinyin letters (26 Roman letters, plus ü and ê) are used to approximate the non-Han language in question as closely as possible. This results in spellings that are different from both the customary spelling of the place name, and the pinyin spelling of the name in Chinese:

Tongyong Pinyin was developed in Taiwan for use in rendering not only Mandarin Chinese, but other languages and dialects spoken on the island such as Taiwanese, Hakka, and aboriginal languages.

See also
 Combining character
 Cyrillization of Chinese
 Pinyin input method
 Romanization of Japanese
 Tibetan pinyin
 Transcription into Chinese characters
 Comparison of Chinese transcription systems
 Two-cell Chinese Braille

Notes

References

Further reading

External links

 Scheme for the Chinese Phonetic Alphabet—The original 1958 Scheme, apparently scanned from a reprinted copy in Xinhua Zidian. PDF version from the Chinese Ministry of Education. 
 Basic rules of the Chinese phonetic alphabet orthography—The official standard GB/T 16159–2012 in Chinese. PDF version from the Chinese Ministry of Education. 
 HTML version 
 Chinese phonetic alphabet spelling rules for Chinese names—The official standard GB/T 28039–2011 in Chinese. PDF version from the Chinese Ministry of Education 
 HTML version 
 Pinyin-Guide.com Pronunciation and FAQs related to Pinyin
 Pinyin Tone Tool (archive) Online editor to create Pinyin with tones

|-

|-

|-

 
Writing systems introduced in 1958
Chinese language
Chinese words and phrases
ISO standards
Mandarin words and phrases
Phonetic alphabets
Phonetic guides
Romanization of Chinese
Ruby characters